John Harty can refer to:

 John Harty (American football)
 John Harty (cricketer)
 John Harty (equestrian)